Presidential Decree 495/1977 divided Egypt into eight (later seven after Matrouh was merged into Alexandria) economic regions for economic and physical planning purposes, that do not have any new administrative representation in the lcoal government heirarchy.

Instead, each region is composed of a number of contiguous governorates, with one declared as capital of the region (that governorate's capital city).

Art. 2 established a Higher Committee for Regional Planning  in each region, headed by the governor of that region's capital, and comprising the governors, heads of the Local Executive Councils, and the head of the national-level General Organization for Physical Planning as secretary general.

Art. 3 set out a Planning Administration for each region that is affiliated to the Ministry of (Economic) Planning. In 2008 this was changed to a Regional Center for Urban Planning and Development affiliated to the GOPP. However, it was believed that planning based on these units was unrealistic thus decentralization efforts were put in place.

Economic regions

There are seven regional units, containing the following governorates. In 2014, plans were discussed to expand the seven to eleven but it didn't happen.

Greater Cairo Region
Cairo Governorate (Cairo as capital)- Giza Governorate - Qalyubia Governorate

Alexandria Region
Alexandria Governorate (Alexandria as capital)- Beheira Governorate - Matruh Governorate

Delta Region
Damietta Governorate (Tanta as capital)- Monufia Governorate - Gharbia Governorate - Kafr El Sheikh Governorate - Dakahlia Governorate

Suez Canal Region
Ismailia Governorate (Ismailia as capital) - Sharqia Governorate - Port Said Governorate - Suez Governorate - North Sinai Governorate - South Sinai Governorate

North Upper Egypt Region
Minya Governorate (Minya as capital)- Beni Suef Governorate - Faiyum Governorate

Asyut Region
Asyut Governorate (Asyut as capital) - New Valley Governorate

Southern Upper Egypt Region
Sohag Governorate - Qena Governorate - Luxor Governorate - Aswan Governorate (Aswan as capital)- Red Sea Governorate

See also
 Economy of Egypt
 Local Government of Egypt
 Subdivisions of Egypt

References

Further reading
 Outcomes of Strategic Urban Development- Greater Cairo Region In Arab Republic of Egypt
 The World Bank - Arab Republic of Egypt Urban Sector Update.pdf - June, 2008

 
Regions of Egypt